Julia Billet (1962, Paris) is a French writer, novelist, author of short stories and poetry

Publications 
Julia Billet published novels, children's books, collections of short stories and poetry collections:
 J'ai mal à mon écorce (album) illustrated by Ana Aranda, Editions du Jasmin
 Le mystère de la chambre froide, (comic strip) with Simon Bailly, Editions du Pourquoi pas ?
 Chambre d'ombre, art book, photographs by Patrick Jacques, graphisme Cyril Dominger, nouvelle Julia Billet, Editions du pourquoi pas, 2016
 Cris de guerres (reprints), le Mot fou éditions, 2016
 Vivre Livre, (collectif d'auteur-e-s, short stories), illustrated by Hélène Humbert, éditions du Pourquoi pas, 2016
 1+1=1 (double album réédition)/le sauvage (Yves Marie Clément), illustrated by Clémence Dupont, 2nd editions du pourquoi pas, 2016
 Salle des pas perdus ( CD MP3) éditions CDL, 2015
 Alors partir, (reprint in series, outil pédagogique FLE) Editions Klett (Germany) 2015
 Corps et graphie, récit d'ateliers d'écriture à France Alzheimer, éditions du Pourquoi pas, October 2015
 MO, roman graphique, Illustrations by Simon Bailly, éditions du Pourquoi pas, September 2015 
 Du vent dans les ailes/un potager qui en sait long, double album, éditions du Pourquoi pas, October 2014 
 A suivre, (short story), éditions  Rhubarbe, February 2014 
 1+1=1 (album), éditions du Pourquoi pas, 2013 
 Promesses (short stories) édition du Muscadier, June 2013 
 Tu (novel), éditions Rhubarbe, October 2012 
  Une bonne nouvelle, (album) Éditions Océan, series "Ti lecteurs", June 2012 
 La guerre de Catherine, (novel) Éditions L’École des loisirs, series Médium, April 2012 
 Petites histoires de quartiers, (short stories) Éditions Océan, series Océan Ados, October 2010 , short stories published with the help of the 
 T'es qui, toi ?(album) Motus Éditions, series Mouchoir de Poche, September 2010 
 Sayonara samouraï, (novel) Le Seuil, May 2009  and 
 Alors, partir ? (novel) Le Seuil, series "Karactère(s)", March 2008  édition pédagogique FLE, Klett (Germany), 2015
 Pourquoi c'est toujours moi qui ?(album) in collaboration with Nana Margabim, Océan Jeunesse, November 2007 
 Noémie lit et crie, (album) Éditions Motus, series Mouchoir de Poche, May 2007 
 Je n'oublierai pas (album) Éditions Motus, series Mouchoir de Poche, July 2006 
 Salle des pas perdus, (novel) L'École des Loisirs, series Médium, May 2003 , audiolib edition, 2015
 De silences et de glace, (novel) L’École des Loisirs, series Médium, March 2002 
 Cris de guerres, (short stories) Éditions HB, series "short texts", August 2000 
 J'ai oublié, (novel) Éditions HB, August 1998 

Short stories
 Petite histoire de quartier, in Les origines (2006)
 Yé cric, bis repetita, in Etranger, (2007)
 les mariés dans Bleu (2008),
 Le photographe, in Chut, 2008
 la vie devant soi dans la mallette pédagogique published by the Observatoire des inégalités (2012)

Short stories and poetry
in journals:
 Cahier du débord, nouvelle, in the journal Le préau des collines (2002)
 Des poèmes extraits d’un recueil "Tracé", in the journal Lieux d’être (2005).
 De vous à moi, texte poétique, in Littera, 2007

Artists' books
 Maison, created then illustrated by painter Youl, 2004,
 Les petits toits du Monde, collective collection of texts around writing (with Louise Warren, Jean Louis Giovannoni, Arno Bertina, Ludovic Degroote…)

Coordination et direction artistique d'ouvrages
 Caracolavie et autres poèmes in collaboration of Esther Puifhouloux and Juliette Rahban (album) and a group of children and adults from the city of Contrexéville
 L'écrivantaire, récit d'expériences d'ateliers d'écriture, with a professional collective of social and cultural, graphics by Amina Bouajila.

Prizes and honours 
 Prix Tapage 2014, for  La guerre de Catherine
 Prix 12/14 de Brive-la-Gaillarde 2008 for Alors, partir ?
 Prix Marguerite Audoux des collégiens en 2006 for Salle des pas perdus
 Prix Sainte-Beuve des collégiens, 2011 for Sayonara samourai
 Numerous selections for la guerre de Catherine ( sur les Prix des dévoreurs de livres 2013, prix des 25H du Mans 2013 Enlivrez vous May 2013, Prix de laudeac 2013, prix Mort de lire de Poissy 2013, Prix farniente 2014) Sayonara Samourai (sur les prix des dévoreurs 2009/2010, Festilivre Nord 2011, Prix Sainte Beuve des collégiens 2011, prix de la ville de Cherbourg-Octeville 2011, prix Tapage Rezé 2014),for Alors, partir ? (sur les prix des lycéens allemands, prix des villes de Tarbes, de Villefranche de Rouergue, de Narbonne, du Mans) and for Salle des pas perdus (sur les Prix Chronos, Prix littéraire des Vosges du jeune lecteur, prix Ruralivre Nord pas de Calais, prix du lecteur jeunesse à Narbonne, Villefranche de Rouergue, les 24h du livre du Mans, prix Farniente en Belgique, prix jeunesse du Haut Rhin, Lire en Seine, prix des collégiens de Haute-Savoie, prix Sésame de St Paul 3 Châteaux, prix de la ville de Mont-de-Marsan)
 Julia Billet was a guest at the Berlin International Literature Festival 2010

References 

 http://www.babelio.com/livres/Billet-La-guerre-de-Catherine/380791

External links 
 Julia Billet on L'École des Loisirs
 List of publications
 Histoire d'en lire

French children's writers
20th-century French women writers
21st-century French women writers
French women children's writers
Prix Sainte-Beuve winners
Writers from Paris
1962 births
Living people